Neolithodes asperrimus is a species of king crab native to the coast of Africa.

They are known to be parasitised by Iphigenella acanthopoda, a species of Gammaridea.

See also
 Neolithodes agassizii, a species close to N. asperrimus

References

King crabs
Crustaceans described in 1947
Crabs of the Atlantic Ocean
Crustaceans of the Indian Ocean
Crustaceans of Africa
Crustaceans of South Africa
Taxa named by Keppel Harcourt Barnard
Invertebrates_of_Brazil